Kosciuszko is a locality in Snowy Valleys Council, New South Wales, Australia. It was previously spelled as Kosciusko.

Heritage listings 
Kosciuszko  has a number of heritage-listed sites, including:

 Mount Kosciuszko to Eden: Bundian Way

References 

Snowy Valleys Council